Forest Glen is a rural residential locality in the Sunshine Coast Region, Queensland, Australia.

Geography
Forest Glen is part of the Buderim urban area.  The western boundary of Forest Glen follows the Bruce Highway.

Eudlo Creek, a tributary of the Maroochy River is the main waterway in the area.

History
Harmony Montessori School opened in Sippy Downs in 1995 with 13 children and one teacher. In 2007, the land being leased for the school was scheduled for development and the school had to relocate.

Sunshine Coast Grammar School opened in 1997. It is owned and operated by the Presbyterian and Methodist Schools Association (PMSA), which also operates Clayfield College, Somerville House and Brisbane Boys' College (all in Brisbane).

Education 
Montessori International College is a private primary and secondary (Prep-12) school for boys and girls at 880 – 932 Maroochydore Road. In 2017, the school had an enrolment of 235 students with 24 teachers (20 full-time equivalent) and 21 non-teaching staff (16 full-time equivalent).

Sunshine Coast Grammar School is a private primary and secondary (Prep-12) school for boys and girls at 372 Mons Road. In 2017, the school had an enrolment of 1,241 students with 97 teachers (93 full-time equivalent) and 74 non-teaching staff (60 full-time equivalent).

Attractions 
It is the home to the Moonshine Valley Winery, and it is near the Forest Glen Deer Sanctuary in Mons, Queensland.

Notable people
 Hugh Sawrey, Australian artist and founder of the Australian Stockman's Hall of Fame was born in Forest Glen

References

External links

 

Suburbs of the Sunshine Coast Region
Buderim
Localities in Queensland